Sergey Prokopyev may refer to:
Sergey Prokopyev (beach volleyball)
Sergey Prokopyev (cosmonaut)